Wifak Sportif Seghanghan is a Moroccan football club currently playing in the third division. The club was founded in 1958 and is located in the town of Segangan.

References

Football clubs in Morocco
Sport in Agadir
1958 establishments in Morocco